Events in the year 1933 in Mexico.

Incumbents

Federal government 
 President: Abelardo L. Rodríguez
 Interior Secretary (SEGOB): Eduardo Vasconcelos
 Secretary of Foreign Affairs (SRE): José Manuel Puig Casauranc
 Communications Secretary (SCT): Miguel M. Acosta Guajardo
 Education Secretary (SEP): Narciso Bassols
 Secretary of Defense (SEDENA):

Supreme Court 

 President of the Supreme Court:

Governors 

 Aguascalientes: Enrique Osorio Camarena (PNR)
 Campeche: Benjamín Romero Esquivel 
 Chiapas: Victórico R. Grajales
 Chihuahua: Rodrigo M. Quevedo
 Coahuila: Salvador Saucedo
Nazario S. Ortiz Garza (until October 10)
Jesús Valdez Sánchez (from October 10)
 Colima: 
 Durango: Carlos Real Félix
 Guanajuato: Melchor Ortega
 Guerrero: 
Adrián Castrejón
Gabriel R. Guevara
 Hidalgo: 
Bartolomé Vargas Lugo
Ernesto Viveros
 Jalisco: 
 State of Mexico
Filiberto Gómez (PNR, 1929–1933)
José Luis Solórzano, (PNR, 1933–1935)
 Michoacán: Dámaso Cárdenas
 Morelos: Vicente Estrada Cajigal (Socialist Revolutionary Party of Morelos, PSRM)
 Nayarit
Luis Castillo Ledón, Constitutional governor (1930-1933)
Rafael Ibarra Trujillo, Interim governor (1931)
Juventino Espinoza Sánchez, Interim governor (1933)
Gustavo B. Azcárraga, Interim governor (1933)
 Nuevo León: 
Francisco A. Cárdenas
Pablo Quiroga
 Oaxaca: Anastasio García Toledo 
 Puebla
Juan Crisóstomo Bonilla (PNR, 1933–1937)
José Mijares Palencia (1933)
Gustavo Ariza (1933-1937)
 Querétaro: Saturnino Osornio
 San Luis Potosí: Ildefonso Turrubiartes 
 Sinaloa: Manuel Páez
 Sonora: Rodolfo Elías Calles (PNR) 
 Tabasco: Tomás Garrido Canabal (PRST)
 Tamaulipas: Albino Hernández (interim)
 Tlaxcala: Adolfo Bonilla (PNR) 
 Veracruz: Gonzalo Vázquez Vela (PNR) 
 Yucatán: Bartolomé García Correa (PNR) 
 Zacatecas: Matías Ramos (PNR)

Events 
August 4 – 1933 Florida–Mexico hurricane: Having passed over Florida, the storm regains hurricane status on August 4, a day before striking northern Mexico with winds of 90 mph. It damages buildings and crops in Tamaulipas, while eavy rains lead to flooding that kills at least 31 people, particularly affectiong the city of Monterrey. 
September 5 – The Mexican Stock Exchange is established.

Popular culture

Sports 
See 
1933–34 in Mexican football
1933–34 in Mexican football

Music 
Carlos Chávez:
Sinfonía de Antígona
Soli I

Film
El vuelo de la muerte, starring Sara García

Literature 
Walter Krickeberg – Los totonaca contribución a la etnografía histórica de la América Central (translation of German work)

Notable births
May 10 – Antonio González Orozco, muralist (died 2020) 
July 4 – La Prieta Linda, singer and actress (died 2021)
October 12 – Florencio Olvera Ochoa, bishop (died 2020)

Notable deaths
 November 18 - Francisco Javier Gaxiola, diplomat, lawyer and politician (born 1870)

References

 
Mexico